Großräschen (Sorbian: Rań) is a town in Lower Lusatia, in Germany. Administratively, it is part of the district of Oberspreewald-Lausitz, in the state of Brandenburg.

Geographical position

Großräschen is south of the Niederlausitzer Landrücken, a sandy stretch of land with pine forests in the centre of Lusatia. The source of the small river Rainitza used to be in meadows north of the town centre. South of the town, Lake Grossraschen (formerly an open-cast lignite mine) was completed in 2018. The town proper comprises the historical core, Kleinräschen, and Großräschen. The southernmost quarter, Bückgen, was pulled down due to mining. Outside the town proper are the villages of Freienhufen (historically Dobristroh),  Bulldorf, Dörrwalde, Wormlage, Saalhausen, Woschkow, and Schmogro (Großräschen-Ost).

History

Both Großräschen and Kleinräschen were first mentioned in an official document in 1370. The form of settlement and the name suggest that Kleinräschen is older than Großräschen. The villages developed slowly; the Wendish population depended almost entirely on agriculture. From the middle of the 19th century onwards, heavy industry developed, and the villages grew rapidly. From 1815 to 1947, they were part of the Prussian Province of Brandenburg. In 1965, they were granted the status of a town, having been incorporated into one community in 1925. From 1952 to 1990, Großräschen was part of the Bezirk Cottbus of East Germany. The 1980s brought the destruction of Bückgen, whose 4000 inhabitants had to leave their homes and were moved into blocks of flats. After the fall of the Berlin Wall, the industrial decline (glass manufacturing, brick production, mining and agriculture used to appear in the town's coat of arms) caused heavy unemployment.  The completion of the Grossraschen lake instigated a tourism industry with lakeside hotels, town marina harbor, rental holiday homes, and a lakeside winery.

Mayors
Thomas Zenker (SPD) was elected in November 2009 with 93.9% of the votes for a term of eight years. (Turnout 35.3%). He was re-elected in September 2017 with 85.6% for a second term of eight years.

Demography

Sights

 Protestant Church
 Catholic Church with interior decoration by Friedrich Preß
 Medieval village church in Freienhufen
 open-cast mine lookout
 Historic village structures in Kleinräschen, Dörrwalde, Wormlage, Saalhausen (farm type of Senftenberger Vierseitenhof)

Infrastructure

 Rail links to Berlin, Senftenberg, Stralsund (slow trains)
 Federal road B 96
 Motorway A 13/E 66

Partner cities
 Trzebiatów (Treptow), Poland, since 2006
 Sprockhövel, Germany
 Hattingen, Germany

People
 Herbert Scurla (1905–1981)
 Bernhard Lehmann (born 1948)
 Hans-Joachim Hartnick (born 1955)

References

External links
 

Populated places in Oberspreewald-Lausitz